Weilrod is a municipality made up of several villages in the northwest Hochtaunuskreis lying in the Weil Valley in Hesse, Germany.

Geography

Location
Weilrod lies north of the crest of the Taunus, from 210 to 600 m above sea level. The nearest bigger towns are Limburg (25 km) in the west, Wetzlar (30 km) in the north, Wiesbaden (35 km) in the south and Frankfurt am Main (35 km) in the southeast.

Neighbouring communities
Weilrod borders in the north on the communities of Weilmünster (Limburg-Weilburg) and Grävenwiesbach, in the east on the town of Usingen, in the south on the communities of Schmitten (all in the Hochtaunuskreis) and Waldems (Rheingau-Taunus-Kreis), and in the west on the town of Bad Camberg and the community of Selters (both in Limburg-Weilburg).

Constituent communities
The community has 13 centres named Altweilnau, Cratzenbach, Emmershausen, Finsternthal, Gemünden, Mauloff, Niederlauken, Neuweilnau, Oberlauken, Rod an der Weil, Riedelbach and Winden.

History
The earliest written record of a village in the area is of Mauloff ("Mulefo") in 1156. The imposing round tower at the castle ruins in Altweilnau has been dated to about 1200.

The merger of the individual communities into the greater community of Weilrod took place in 1972.

Community's name
The name Weilrod stems on the one hand from the river Weil, a brook that forms Weilrod's and neighbouring Schmitten's landscape, and on the other hand from the German word Roden – "clearing".

Both these name stems are also found in constituent communities' names:

Neu- and Altweilnau (Weil + Aue ["floodplain"])
Rod an der Weil (Rod(-en) + Weil)
Riedelbach (Roden + Bach ["brook"])

The village of Mauloff has a rather interesting name origin, according to the local lore, anyway. Since the name Mauloff does not fit any usual German name pattern, it affords wonderful fodder for legends and quaint stories. One of these stories holds that the village was originally nameless, and that to give it a name, the mayor called a meeting, deciding beforehand that the first word out of anyone's mouth would be the village's new name. Those gathered for the meeting, however, sat there without uttering a word. At last, the mayor ran out of patience and shouted "Maul off!" (roughly "Mouth open!" ie "Say something!", using Maul – more commonly the zoological word for mouth – and off, a variant of auf).

Mauloff had its first documentary mention in 1156 as "Mulefo", a stopping place on the mediaeval road through the heights, the Rennstraße.

Politics

Municipal council

The municipal elections on 26 March 2006 yielded the following results:

Note: FWG is a citizens' coalition.

Economy
During the economic boom in the 1950s, the villages that now make up Weilrod were a favourite local recreation area for people who lived in the nearby Frankfurt Rhein-Main Region. Since then, tourism has dropped off noticeably. Nevertheless, the landscape in the municipal area attracts hikers and cyclists, for which a certain amount of credit must go to the Weiltalweg, a trail through the Weil Valley.

The loudspeaker manufacturer Canton Elektronik GmbH was founded in Weilrod and still has its headquarters there. Other companies in the community are Mania (tool technology), Grünauer Maschinen GmbH and AZ (Armaturen-Zimmermann, founded in Hasselbach).

References

External links
 Weilrod
 

Hochtaunuskreis